The South West Queensland Pipeline (SWQP) is a bidirectional natural gas transmission pipeline in southern Queensland. It was built in 1996 to carry gas  from the Ballera gas plant to the gas trading hub at Wallumbilla. The original section is also known as the Ballera to Wallumbilla Pipeline System, and the extension as the Queensland/South Australia/New South Wales (QSN) Link. In 2014 the combined system was reconfigured to be bidirectional.

The pipeline has intersections with several other gas transmission pipelines along its route. At Moomba, it can deliver gas to the Moomba to Sydney Pipeline and Moomba Adelaide Pipeline System, plus bidirectional flow to/from the Moomba Gas Hub and trade point. At the Ballera gas plant it has bidirectional interchange with the Carpentaria Gas Pipeline. It can also deliver gas at Tarbat oilfield 26km south of Eromanga, Cheepie and Roma, Queensland en route to the Wallumbilla Hub.

See also

List of natural gas pipelines

References

Natural gas pipelines in Australia
Energy in Queensland
1996 establishments in Australia